Ayushi Soni (born 30 September 2000) is an Indian cricketer. In November 2020, Soni played for the IPL Supernovas in the 2020 Women's T20 Challenge tournament. In February 2021, Soni earned her maiden call-up to the India women's cricket team, for their limited overs matches against South Africa. She made her Women's Twenty20 International (WT20I) debut for India, against South Africa, on 23 March 2021.

References

External links
 
 

2000 births
Living people
Indian women cricketers
India women Twenty20 International cricketers
Cricketers from Delhi
Delhi women cricketers
IPL Supernovas cricketers